Tighanab may refer to:
 Tighanab Bala